See also Norlane, Victoria, named after Norman Lane, an Australian serviceman

Norman D. Lane (November 6, 1919 – August 6, 2014) was a Canadian sprint canoeist who competed in the late 1940s and early 1950s. Competing in two Summer Olympics, he won a bronze in the C-1 10,000 m event at London in 1948. He competed in the 1952 Helsinki Olympics and finished fifth. His brother Ken Lane was a medallist at the 1952 Games in sprint canoe.

Born in Toronto in 1919, Lane earned a PhD in Mathematics from the University of Toronto, and was a distinguished professor of Mathematics at McMaster University from 1952 to 1987. He and his wife, Doris, had five sons: Douglas, Brian, Stephen, Alan, and Christopher. Lane died in Hamilton, Ontario on August 6, 2014, aged 94.

References

External links 
Norman Lane's profile at Sports Reference.com

1919 births
2014 deaths
Canoeists from Toronto
Canadian male canoeists
Canoeists at the 1948 Summer Olympics
Canoeists at the 1952 Summer Olympics
Olympic bronze medalists for Canada
Olympic canoeists of Canada
Academic staff of McMaster University
Olympic medalists in canoeing
Medalists at the 1948 Summer Olympics